The 2019–20 Federation Cup, also known as TVS Federation Cup 2019 (due to sponsorship reason from TVS Motor Company), was 31st edition of the tournament, the main domestic annual club football  competition in Bangladesh organized by Bangladesh Football Federation. The 13 participants will compete for the tournament. The winner of the tournament will earn the slot of playing preliminary round of 2021 AFC Cup.

Dhaka Abahani are current champions. The club have defeated Bashundhara Kings by 3–1 on 23 November 2018.

Venue

Participating  teams
Arambagh KS
Bangladesh Police FC
Bashundhara Kings
Brothers Union
Chittagong Abahani
Dhaka Abahani
Dhaka Mohammedan
Muktijoddha Sangsad KC
Rahmatganj MFS
Saif Sporting Club
Sheikh Jamal Dhanmondi Club
Sheikh Russel KC
Uttar Baridhara SC

Prize money
Champion got US$6,000 
Runner-up got US$3,600

Draw
The draw ceremony of the tournament was held on 13 December 2019 at 15:30 BST on the 3rd floor of BFF House Motijheel, Dhaka. The thirteen teams were divided into four groups. The top two teams from each group will move into the Quarter-Finals.

Match officials

 Mizanur Rahman
 Shah Alam
 Saymoon Hasan Sany
 Ferdous Ahamed
 Mahmud Hasan Mamun
 Mohammad Zamil Farooq Nahid
 GM Chowdhury Nayan
 Mohammad Jalaluddin
 Jashim Akhter
 Bhovon Mohon Talukdar

Group stage
All matches will be held at Dhaka
Time listed are UTC+6:00

Group A

Group B

Group C

Group D

Knockout stage
 All matches will play at Dhaka
Times listed are UTC+6:00
In the knockout stage, extra-time and a penalty shoot-out will used to decide the winner if necessary.

Bracket

Quarter-finals

Semi-finals

Final

Goalscorers

Sponsored by
The title sponsor of 2019–20 Bangladesh Federation Cup is TVS Motor Company.

Broadcast partners
The private satellite TV channel Bangla TV will live telecast all matches from the stadium.

See also
2019-20 Bangladesh Premier League
2020 Bangabandhu National Football Championship
2020 Bangabandhu Cup
2019 Bangamata U-19 Women's Gold Cup
2019 Sheikh Kamal International Club Cup
2020 Bangladesh Women's Football League
2019 BFF U-18 Football Tournament
2018-19 Bangladesh Championship League
2019 Dhaka Senior Division League

References

Bangladesh Federation Cup
2019 in Bangladeshi football
1
2019–20 Asian domestic association football cups